Siege of Tiberias may refer to the following:

The Siege of Tiberias (1187), during the Battle of Hattin
Sieges of Tiberias (1742–1743) by the Ottoman governor of Damascus against the tax farmer Zahir al-Umar